"Vår julskinka har rymt" is a song recorded by Swedish duo Werner & Werner for their debut studio album, Kockarnas skiva (1988). 

The song became a Svensktoppen hit for three weeks, staying at the chart between 11 December 1988-8 January 1989, with fifth, third and another fifth place as result. The song is credited Billy Butt.

Track listing and formats 

 Swedish 7-inch single

A. "Vår julskinka har rymt" – 4:36
B. "Vår julskinka har rymt (Version 2: Sjung själv får du se hur lätt det är)" – 4:36

 Swedish 12-inch single

A. "Vår julskinka har rymt (Remix)" – 6:27
B1. "Vår julskinka har rymt" – 4:36
B2. "Vår julskinka har rymt (Version 2: Sjung själv får du se hur lätt det är)" – 4:36

Credits and personnel 

 Sven Melander – vocals
 Åke Cato – songwriter, vocals
 Joakim Bergman – songwriter
 Billy Butt – songwriter, producer
 Mats Wester – producer, arranger
 Jaan Orvet – cover art, photographer

Credits and personnel adopted from the Kockarnas skiva album and 7-inch single liner notes.

Charts

Weekly charts

References

External links 

 

1988 songs
1988 singles
Swedish Christmas songs
Swedish-language songs